Chitimacha (  or  , Sitimaxa) is a language isolate historically spoken by the Chitimacha people of Louisiana, United States. It became extinct in 1940 with the death of the last fluent speaker, Delphine Ducloux.

Although no longer spoken, it is fairly extensively documented in the early 20th-century work (mostly unpublished) of linguists Morris Swadesh and John R. Swanton.  Swadesh in particular wrote a full grammar and dictionary, and collected numerous texts from the last two speakers, although none of this is published.

Language revitalization efforts are underway to teach the language to a new generation of speakers. Tribal members have received Rosetta Stone software for learning the language. As of 2015, a new Chitimacha dictionary is in preparation, and classes are being taught on the Chitimacha reservation.

Classification
Chitimacha has recently been proposed to be related to, or a member of, the hypothetical Totozoquean language family. An automated computational analysis (ASJP 4) by Müller et al. (2013) found lexical similarities between Chitimacha, Huave, and Totozoquean.

However, since the analysis was automatically generated, the grouping could be either due to mutual lexical borrowing or genetic inheritance.

An earlier, more speculative, proposal suggested an affinity with the also hypothetical group of Gulf languages.

Phonology 
Brown, Wichmann, and Beck (2014) give the following phoneme inventory based on Morris Swadesh's 1939 analysis.

Consonants

Vowels

Orthography
Transcription has been done by researchers in a number of orthographies, including French, Spanish, and Americanist. Members of the Chitimacha tribe have developed a practical orthography using the Latin alphabet which does not use diacritics or special characters. It retains elements of the orthography earlier used by Morris Swadesh.

Grammar
Chitimacha has a grammatical structure which is not dissimilar from modern Indo-European languages but it is still quite distinctive. Chitimacha distinguishes several word classes: verbs, nouns, adjectives (verbal and nominal), quantifiers, demonstratives. Swadesh (1946) states that the remaining word classes are hard to distinguish but may be divided "into proclitics, postclitics, and independent particles". Chitimacha has auxiliaries which are inflected for tense, aspect and mood, such as to be.  Polar interrogatives may be marked with a final falling intonation and a clause final post-position.  

Chitimacha does not appear to have adopted any grammatical features from their interactions with the French, Spanish or Americans.

Pronouns
Verbs are inflected for person and number of the subject.  Ambiguity may be avoided by the use of the personal pronouns (shown in the table below), but sentences without personal pronouns are common. There is no gender in the personal pronouns and verbal indexes. Subject and object personal pronouns are identical.

Pronouns are more restricted than nouns when appearing in a possessive construction. Pronouns cannot be proceeded by a possessive unlike nouns.

Nouns 
There are definite articles in Chitmacha. Nouns are mostly uninflected, there are only approximately 30 nouns (mostly kinship or referring to persons) which distinguish a singular or plural form through a plural suffix or other formations.

Nouns are free, or may be possessed by juxtaposing the possessor and the possessed noun. 

ʔiš ʔinž̹i = my father ("I father")

was ʔasi ʔinž̹i = that man's father ("that man father")

Sample Sentences 
The following sentences and translations are from the book "Modern Chitimacha (Sitimaxa)" (2008), endorsed by the Chitimata Tribal government's Cultural Department.

References

External links
 OLAC resources in and about the Chitimacha language

Chitimacha
Language isolates of North America
Languages of the United States
Extinct languages of North America
Indigenous languages of the North American Southeast
Native American language revitalization
Languages extinct in the 1940s
1940 disestablishments in Louisiana